USS Harmon may refer to:

, was a planned  transferred during construction to the Royal Navy in June 1943 and renamed HMS Aylmer
, a Buckley-class destroyer escort active during World War II

United States Navy ship names